Murray Wallace may refer to:

 Murray Wallace (footballer) (born 1993), Scottish professional footballer
 Murray Wallace (rugby union) (born 1967), Scottish international rugby union player